Clarke Sanders is an American politician. He serves as a Republican member for the 69th district of the Kansas House of Representatives.

In 2021, Sanders was elected for the 69th district of the Kansas House of Representatives. He succeeded J. R. Claeys. Sanders assumed office on January 11, 2021. He was a radio personality for the radio broadcasting station KSAL, hosting Friendly Fire and The Clarke Sanders Show.

References 

Living people
Place of birth missing (living people)
Year of birth missing (living people)
Republican Party members of the Kansas House of Representatives
21st-century American politicians
American radio personalities